Jan-Willem Staman (born 9 January 1984) is a Guamanian international footballer of Dutch descent who plays for Rovers in the Guam Men's Soccer League. He has also been called up to the Guam national football team in 2015, and has played in several national games.

Career

Early career
Staman briefly played for the youth team of Twente.

VV DES
In 1990, Staman joined a local amateur club in his hometown of Nijverdal called VV DES. He made his debut for the club in August 2001 at the age of 17.

Guam
In 2011, Staman joined a local amateur club in the Guam Men's Soccer League called Strykers. He switched clubs in 2013 and joined the Quality Distributors.

International career
Staman received his first call up for the Guam national football team in March 2015 for the friendly matches against Hong Kong and Singapore. He made his debut by coming on at half time in the Hong Kong friendly. Staman made his second appearance in the friendly match against Singapore coming on the 84th minute.

Staman was called up for the 2018 FIFA World Cup qualification matches against Turkmenistan and India. Staman started his first match later during the qualification against Oman.

Personal life
Staman moved to the island of Guam in 2011. He is married to an American woman named Marylou. He currently works full-time at an aquarium and is a part-time dive instructor.

References

1984 births
Living people
Dutch footballers
Guamanian footballers
Guam international footballers
Association football midfielders
Quality Distributors players
People from Hellendoorn
Footballers from Overijssel
Guamanian people of Dutch descent